, subtitled Momo: The Girl God of Death, is a Japanese light novel series written by K-Ske Hasegawa, with illustrations by Nanakusa. The series includes twelve novels released between June 10, 2003 and April 10, 2009, published by ASCII Media Works under their Dengeki Bunko imprint. The novels were licensed by Seven Seas Entertainment for release in English with the first novel released in March 2008. The series revolves around Momo, a shinigami, and her familiar Daniel, a talking black cat, as they interfere with the world of the living.

A radio drama of the series aired on ASCII Media Works' Dengeki Taishō radio program between April and May 2005, and the recordings were collected into a drama CD released in June 2005. A manga adaptation by Asuka Izumi was serialized in Hakusensha's shōjo manga magazines LaLa and LaLa DX between May 2005 and February 2007. A six-episode anime adaptation of the series produced by Group TAC aired between March and April 2006 on WOWOW satellite TV. Lastly, a TV drama which aired on TV Tokyo was produced between January and March 2007, containing twelve episodes.

Plot and characters

Ballad of a Shinigami primarily centers around a young-looking girl named  who is a shinigami, or death god. Momo is clad in all white, along with having long white hair, and as a god of death, she leads deceased souls to the other side. She carries with her a large scythe and an ID card which helps to facilitate in her identification as a shinigami; her shinigami ID number is A-100100. Momo is different from other shinigami because she tries to ease the suffering of the people she encounters whether they be living or already dead, such as conveying messages from the dead to the living. She is also known to cry a lot, and she says that she cries for the dead because they no longer can. Accompanying Momo is a talking black cat familiar named  with a bell around his neck and bat-like wings who helps Momo out. The living frequently hear the ringing of Daniel's bell when Momo and Daniel are nearby. Daniel has a calm character and does not show as much sympathy to humans as Momo, but is still patient with them. In the TV drama, Daniel is portrayed as a young boy rather than a cat. The story follows Momo and Daniel as they interact with the living and usually consists of them changing something sorrowful for the living.

Another shinigami featured in the series is also a young-looking girl named  who is clad in all black, along with having black hair. Like Momo, she shows outward emotion towards the living and dead, but An has a cruel personality and does not give mercy to anyone. Despite the fact that shinigami are meant to transport souls to the other side, An chooses to terminate the souls of the people she kills. Among shinigami, she is very powerful, and is referred to as a special type of shinigami. Her shinigami ID number is A-99. Before starting to work with An, Nicol had once been very close friends with Daniel.

Media

Light novels
Ballad of a Shinigami is a series of light novels written by K-Ske Hasegawa, and drawn by Nanakusa. Twelve novels were published by ASCII Media Works under their Dengeki Bunko publishing imprint between June 10, 2003 and April 10, 2009. Twenty-one chapters, plus another five more special chapters, were serialized in MediaWorks' now-defunct light novel magazine Dengeki hp. Of the main twenty-one chapters, seven were later included in the released light novel volumes. The novels were licensed by Seven Seas Entertainment for release in English; the first volume was released in March 2008. Seven Seas published the first two light novels in the original pocket format used in Japan, rather than the larger standard size normally used for manga and North American releases of Japanese light novels. Seven Seas dropped the series after the second novel though for unknown reasons.

A four-chapter spin off of the series entitled Cheerful Charmer Momo was also created. The first chapter was made available through mail order via the summer 2004 edition of Dengeki hp, though chapters one, three, and four were serialized in other now-defunct MediaWorks light novel anthologies which include Dengeki p, Dengeki hPa, and Dengeki Bunkoyomi. Another spin-off series of short stories entitled Ballad of a Shinigami: Unknown Stars began serialization in ASCII Media Works' light novel magazine Dengeki Bunko Magazine on February 9, 2008. The stories are illustrated by Keiji Yamamoto, though Nanakusa provides the visual concepts that Yamamoto uses as a base for the stories. The story is different from the original, and is primarily a "school life" story. The first volume of Unknown Stars was released on September 10, 2008, and as of December 10, 2009, three volumes have been released under Dengeki Bunko.

Art books
A sixty-four-page picture book entitled  was written and illustrated by the same creators of the light novels and released by ASCII Media Works on January 28, 2005 under their Dengeki Bunko Visual Novel label. A 108-page art book illustrated by Nanakusa was released by ASCII Media Works on April 6, 2006, and also contained an original Ballad of a Shinigami short story by K-Ske Hasegawa.

Audio dramas
The second chapter of the Cheerful Charmer Momo spin-off was originally broadcast as a four-episode radio drama between April 9, 2005 and May 2005 on ASCII Media Works' Dengeki Taishō radio program. The radio drama was later released as a drama CD through mail order via volume thirty-six of Dengeki hp released on June 18, 2005. The CD contained the radio drama recording called  plus a new track titled "Snow Rebirth", and also one secret track. The CD came with an original story booklet containing a short story entitled , a small hand mirror, and an original sticker set. In the drama, Momo was voiced by Mamiko Noto, and Daniel was voiced by Ryō Hirohashi. Another radio drama, again four episodes long and broadcast on Dengeki Taishō, aired between January 12, 2008 and February 2008. The new drama was based on the story  from volume ten of the light novels. The radio drama was later released as a drama CD through mail order via volume one of Dengeki Bunko Magazine released on April 10, 2008. The CD contained the drama's opening and ending themes, the radio drama recording "Toward Your Transparency and Carbonated Water." plus a new track titled , and also one secret track. The CD came with an original sticker set and a notepad.

Manga
A twelve-chapter manga adaptation illustrated by Asuka Izumi was serialized in two shōjo manga magazines published by Hakusensha—LaLa, and LaLa DX—though nine chapters were serialized in LaLa DX, two were serialized in LaLa, and one (the prologue) was only included in volume one of the bound volumes. The first chapter was serialized on May 24, 2005 in LaLa, and ended in LaLa DX on February 10, 2007. Three volumes comprising four chapters each were released under Haksensha's Hana to Yume Comics label between March 4, 2006 and June 10, 2007. The manga has been licensed by CMX for distribution in North America.

Anime
An anime adaptation produced by Group TAC, directed by Tomomi Mochizuki, and written by Reiko Yoshida aired on WOWOW in Japan between March 3, 2006 and April 7, 2006, containing six episodes. The anime has been licensed by Japanese-based company Bost Digital Entertainment for distribution through their video streaming website Bost TV with English subtitles. The episodes are available only to Australia and New Zealanders for the price of US$1.99 per episode. In the anime, Momo was voiced by Akiko Kobayashi, and Daniel was voiced by Ai Shimizu. The anime's opening theme is "No One" and the ending theme is "White Messenger"; both songs are sung by Koy, and the maxi single containing the theme songs was released by Pony Canyon on March 15, 2006. Notably, the opening theme is sung entirely in English while the ending theme has normal Japanese lyrics. The anime's original soundtrack was released on April 26, 2006 containing twenty-two music tracks and eight audio drama tracks. Three DVD compilation volumes were released by Pony Canyon between June 7, 2006 and August 2, 2006, each with two episodes each, and were sold in limited and regular editions. The DVD box set containing the six episodes was released on February 20, 2008. The anime is licensed by Maiden Japan, and the series was distributed on DVD by Section23 Films on June 25, 2013.

Episodes

TV drama
A TV drama directed by Kōtarō Terauchi aired on TV Tokyo between January 9, 2007 and March 27, 2007, containing twelve episodes. It was the second TV drama from Dengeki Bunko since Hanbun no Tsuki ga Noboru Sora. Momo was portrayed by Shōko Hamada, and Daniel was played by Riko Yoshida. Six DVD compilation volumes were sold: volumes one and two were released on April 27, 2007, volumes three and four were released on May 25, 2007, and volumes five and six were sold on June 22, 2007; each volume contained two episodes.

Reception
Overall reviews of the anime adaptation titled Momo, Girl God of Death have been mixed. Theron Martin from Anime News Network gave both the subtitled and dubbed versions a C+ grade overall. Theron states that the first story is "sappy", with the overall stories not being fulfilling. He calls the art "mediocre" and also criticizes the poor English dub mispronunciations. Theron though also describes Momo's character as cute, and "interestingly different" for her role. Stig Høgset from THEM Anime Reviews called the anime melancholic, and tacky at points but is a series that sticks in your memory. Chris Beveridge from The Fandom Post also gave the anime a review saying it felt like a "90s OVA". He also went on to praise the series for being short but sweet giving the anime an overall B grade. In March 2007, it was reported by Mediaworks that over 1.3 million copies of the first ten light novel volumes were sold in Japan.

References

External links
Ballad of a Shinigami  at Seven Seas Entertainment
TV drama official website 

2005 manga
CMX (comics) titles
Dengeki Bunko
Hakusensha manga
Japanese drama television series
Kadokawa Dwango franchises
Maiden Japan
Seven Seas Entertainment titles
Sharp Point Press titles
Shinigami in anime and manga
Shōjo manga
Supernatural anime and manga
TV Tokyo original programming
Wowow original programming